Kutay Eryoldaş (born February 11, 1989) is a Turkish former competitive figure skater. He is a two-time national silver medalist and competed at seven ISU Championships. He trained in Ankara and Moscow.

Programs

Competitive highlights

References

External links
 

Turkish male single skaters
Sportspeople from Ankara
Living people
1989 births
Competitors at the 2011 Winter Universiade
Competitors at the 2009 Winter Universiade